"Heartbeat Like Thunder" is a song by British singer-songwriter Steve Harley, released in 1986 by RAK as a non-album single. The song was written by Harley and ex-Cockney Rebel keyboardist Duncan Mackay, and produced by Mickie Most.

Background
In 1985, Harley signed a five-album recording contract with Mickie Most's label RAK and his debut single for the label, "Irresistible", reached the top 100 of the UK Singles Chart. Towards the end of the year, Harley got involved with Andrew Lloyd-Webber's upcoming musical The Phantom of the Opera. He found himself back in the top 10 when "The Phantom of the Opera" single, recorded as a duet with Sarah Brightman, reached number 7 in February 1986. Harley soon found himself set to star as the Phantom in the upcoming musical.

Despite his new commitments to the musical, Harley continued working on his own solo material for RAK, including "Heartbeat Like Thunder". It was recorded at RAK Studios with its co-writer and Harley's former bandmate Duncan Mackay on keyboards and Big Country drummer Mark Brzezicki on drums. It was mastered at the Penthouse, Abbey Road Studios. Upon its completion, Most was particularly interested in releasing the song as a single, with Harley recalling in 2015, "Mickie loved the song and produced it with great sympathy, I think."

As the follow-up to "Irresistible", "Heartbeat Like Thunder" was released in April 1986. Despite the success of "The Phantom of the Opera" in the UK Singles Chart, "Heartbeat Like Thunder" failed to make an appearance in the top 100 and stalled at number 172. Regardless, Harley and Most continued to work together on Harley's upcoming solo album El Gran Senor. The album was set for release in 1986, but after a remixed version of "Irresistible" was released later in 1986, RAK folded and the album was shelved. Some of the songs due to be released on the album appeared on Harley's 1992 album Yes You Can, but "Heartbeat Like Thunder" was not included.

Release
"Heartbeat Like Thunder" was released by RAK Records on 7-inch and 12-inch vinyl in the UK only. The B-side, "Warm My Cold Heart", was written and produced by Harley. The track has remained exclusive to the single and has not appeared on any other release. It was first introduced live during Steve Harley & Cockney Rebel's 1980 Christmas tour. For the 12-inch release, an extended version of "Heartbeat Like Thunder" was included. The single's sleeve features a photograph of Harley taken by Adrian Peacock.

Although "Heartbeat Like Thunder" was not released in Canada, it achieved airplay on the Greater Toronto Area's CFNY-FM. It was listed as the station's "single add of the week" in May 1986 and was reported in July to be one of the station's top requested import songs.

Following its original release as a single, the song has not appeared on any Steve Harley compilations. In 1994, the extended remix version appeared on the Canadian various artists compilation Hardest Hits, Vol. 3, released on the SPG label. In 2003, the CD was included as part of a three disc set titled Hardest Hits.

Critical reception
On its release, Lee Jacobs of the Bury Free Press gave the song a 3 out of 10 rating and wrote, "A 'nice' song from that 'nice' Mr Harley dear – you know the one? He used to have an edge to him." John Lee of the Huddersfield Daily Examiner described the song as an "agreeable medium-paced soft rocker" and concluded that although it was "nothing special", the "insistent off-beat melody could prove hit material". He added, "The Cockney Rebel has aged well, and his on-record performances are as capable and youthfully mellow as they were a decade or so ago."

Speaking of Harley's work on the Phantom of the Opera musical and the release of "Heartbeat Like Thunder", Bill Hagerty commented in a 1986 issue of One Day Magazine, "With the Phantom single already released and with a single of his own, 'Heartbeat Like Thunder', also out, everyone knows that Harley's back in business. There's also the stage production of the Phantom, due later this year, plus a recording deal with RAK Records. It's a truly remarkable re-emergence into the limelight by this 35-year-old son of a South London postman. But don't mention the comeback word to Steve Harley. It makes him mad." Andy Kellman of AllMusic retrospectively highlighted the song by mentioning it in a review of the Hardest Hits, Vol. 3 compilation.

Track listing
7-inch single
"Heartbeat Like Thunder" – 3:51
"Warm My Cold Heart" – 3:28

12-inch single
"Heartbeat Like Thunder" (Extended Re-mix) – 5:47
"Warm My Cold Heart" – 3:28

Personnel
 Steve Harley – vocals
 Duncan Mackay – keyboards
 Mark Brzezicki – drums

Production
 Mickie Most – producer of "Heartbeat Like Thunder"
 Steve Harley – producer of "Warm My Cold Heart"

Other
 Graham Marks – design
 Adrian Peacock – photography

Charts

References

1986 songs
1986 singles
Steve Harley songs
Songs written by Steve Harley
Song recordings produced by Mickie Most
RAK Records singles